Sisters is an American family drama television series that aired on NBC for six seasons from May 11, 1991 to May 4, 1996. The series was created by Ron Cowen and Daniel Lipman, who were also the executive producers and showrunners. The show debuted on May 11, 1991, for a seven-episode test run and was subsequently renewed for the 1991 fall schedule.

Overview
Sisters focused on four very different sisters living in Winnetka, Illinois.  Their recently deceased father, Thomas Reed, a doctor, had been absent and a workaholic, while their long-suffering mother, Beatrice, turned to alcoholism to cope with his neglect and affairs. Having always wanted sons, their father had called the girls by male versions of their full names: Alexandra was called Alex; Theodora, Teddy; Georgiana, Georgie; and Francesca, Frankie.

For the first two seasons, each episode began with the sisters' weekly ritual of chatting in a steam bath together, but switched to a more traditional opening sequence beginning with the 1992–1993 season: glossy, black-and-white filmed scenes of the sisters engaging in various activities during both their childhood and adult years. Initially, the only soundtrack used for the opening was the sounds of the characters, but in the fall of 1993 a piano solo composed by John Debney was added as theme music.

Most episodes of the show featured a number of flashbacks, in which the characters would interact with or simply observe their younger selves (played by younger actresses).  Although the show was a drama with soap opera–style storylines, the show was also quirky and offbeat in the style of other shows at the time like CBS's Northern Exposure.

Season One
One year after her husband's death, Beatrice reluctantly sold the family home to move into a seniors' condominium building.  Depressed, Beatrice relapses on alcohol and is arrested for driving under the influence.  Teddy comes back into town from California to discover her ex-husband Mitch is dating her younger sister Frankie. Alex believes her husband Wade is cheating on her, but instead discovers he is a crossdresser.  Bea goes to court for her DUI charge; the judge on her case, Truman Ventner, is an acquaintance of hers who also happens to live in her building.  Teddy pursues Mitch and although he resists her, they eventually spend a night together; shortly afterward Mitch and Frankie (who is unaware of the encounter) announce their engagement and plan a quick wedding.  Teddy breaks up their wedding drunk with a shotgun; Frankie decides not to reschedule the wedding and she and Mitch stop seeing each other.  Ashamed of how her behavior is affecting the family and especially her daughter Cat, Teddy leaves Cat with Mitch and announces she will return to California alone.  Georgie's son Evan is diagnosed with leukemia, and Teddy decides to stay in Winnetka.

Season Two
Georgie attempts to balance her needs with Evan's during his treatment.  Alex discovers Wade has been cheating on her for six months with a former patient, and she and Wade divorce.  Reed (Ashley Judd) reacts by rebelling and dropping out of school.  Frankie makes a financial investment in Mitch's fish market; while filing paperwork at City Hall, they decide to elope.  Teddy discovers she is pregnant with Mitch's baby following their earlier brief encounter; she tells the family that she became pregnant after a one-night stand.  Mitch eventually finds out the truth, but Frankie never does.  Truman and Beatrice begin a relationship.  Teddy begins a job doing window dressing at a fashion boutique, then suffers a miscarriage.  Alex begins dating her plumber, Victor, while Wade tries to win her back.  After Evan's favorite teacher is dismissed for being HIV-positive, Georgie runs for the school board, but narrowly loses.  Teddy is let go from the fashion boutique, embarks on a brief career as a "Wonderful You" makeup saleslady, and begins her clothing design career when during an (unsuccessful) makeup sales party, Alex's socialite friends notice Teddy's hand-painted blouse and demand to order blouses of their own.  Alex and Wade decide to reconcile.  Frankie discovers she cannot carry a child; following a failed adoption, she asks Georgie to be a surrogate mother for her baby.

Season Three
Alex plans an elaborate ceremony and reception at her house for Truman and Beatrice's wedding, but they decide to elope; Reed and Kirby (Paul Rudd) are married there instead.  Georgie gives birth to Frankie's son Thomas George after a car accident; Georgie has difficulty seeing him as her sister's child.  Alex and Teddy feud due to Alex's jealousy of Teddy's newfound success as a clothing designer.  Simon Bolt (Mark Frankel) invests in Teddy's fashion design company but later sells it to a Texan investor without consulting Teddy.  Teddy walks away from her company when the new owner does not respect her artistic vision.  A Hollywood producer makes a TV movie of the family's surrogacy story.  Alex is diagnosed with breast cancer, which leads her to doing a standup comedy act about her cancer experience.  Frankie and Mitch divorce and spar over custody of Thomas George.

Season Four
Cat is attacked and raped by a college acquaintance; James Falconer (George Clooney) is assigned to investigate the case.  He is able to help Cat remember her attacker, Kyle, and he is arrested. However the prosecution cannot prove its case and Kyle is found not guilty only to be shot and killed on the courthouse steps by a previous victim.  Frankie quits her executive job and buys the Sweet Sixteen diner.  Teddy and Falconer run into each other at an AA meeting and begin dating.  Trevor rebels and is sent to boarding school, then runs away from the school and disappears.  Georgie falls into a depression about her perceived failure as a parent and considers suicide, but decides against it and asks for help.  Truman is diagnosed with Alzheimer's disease and initially refuses to tell Beatrice.  The stress of Trevor's disappearance leads Georgie and John to separate.  Alex gets her own talk show with a lesbian producer named Norma (Nora Dunn). Alex meets Big Al (Robert Klein) when he agrees to sponsor her talk show; she initially dislikes him but they soon begin dating.  A fifth sister, Charlotte Bennett (Jo Anderson), is introduced. Charlotte is a cancer patient who needs a bone marrow donation from a relative.  Although none of the sisters are a match, she receives the bone marrow from an unrelated donor. Keeping the customary manner in which her half-sisters go by male versions of their full names, Charley is brought into the family and welcomed, primarily through Frankie's effort and determination.  Alex and Big Al marry; on their wedding night he is arrested for tax evasion.  Georgie and John reunite after realizing they cannot control what happens to Trevor.  Reed returns for a visit and gives birth to Halsey.  Trevor finally returns from the streets when Winnetka is hit by a tornado, and Falconer and Teddy marry on a plane that is caught in the storm.

Season Five
Falconer is killed.  His murder was ordered by a criminal he was about to testify against in court.  Georgie begins seeing a new therapist, Dr. Caspian (Daniel Gerroll), who manipulates her into believing she had been molested by her father.  Frankie inherits a boxer, Lucky (John Wesley Shipp), from a former client, and eventually begins a relationship with him.  A viewer with terminal cancer asks Alex to take care of her daughter, Roxie (Kathryn Zaremba); Alex wants to adopt the little girl, but her father returns and they move away together.  Unable to cope with Falconer's death, Teddy relapses with alcohol.  Big Al is released from prison early and runs for mayor.  Teddy shows up drunk to his election night victory party and hits Evan on his bicycle with her car; she leaves to enter rehab.  Truman gives Alex a videotaped message asking her to help him end his life once his Alzheimer's has advanced.  Dr. Caspian and Georgie begin an affair during her therapy sessions; Georgie leaves John, believing Dr. Caspian loves her, but Dr. Caspian ignores her and claims she has misinterpreted their "work" together.  Georgie realizes she has been manipulated, but has no evidence to get the psychological board to revoke his license.  Charley begins therapy with Dr. Caspian and eventually manages to record him behaving inappropriately toward her during their sessions.  Norma fires Alex from her talk show for talking about AIDS against the network's wishes.  Frankie accidentally creates Cowlotta, a large pink cow character that children love, and is asked to move to Japan to manage the character.  Alex helps Truman end his life; she is arrested, but avoids prison when a terminally ill judge recuses himself from her case.  Teddy has an affair with Daniel Albright (Gregory Harrison), the man who had Falconer killed, in an attempt to gather evidence that will send him to jail.  With Lucky's help, she succeeds and Albright is arrested.  Alex and Norma run a pledge drive for the local PBS station and are asked to create a new version of Alex's talk show.  Bea is depressed following Truman's death; Charley offers her a job working as a receptionist in her free clinic.  Teddy meets Jack Chambers (Philip Casnoff), the man who received Falconer's transplanted heart, and strikes up a brief relationship with him.

Season Six
Now divorced from John, Georgie goes to graduate school in psychology.  She begins a relationship with Brian (Joe Flanigan), a 24-year-old student in her classes who was very standoffish to her at first.  Teddy and Cat are carjacked; Cat meets police officer Billy Griffin (Eric Close) when reporting the crime.  Later, Teddy is accidentally shot in the head with the gun she bought for protection.  She falls into a coma, but Alex convinces brilliant neurosurgeon Dr. Gabriel Sorenson (Stephen Collins) to operate and save her life.  Teddy eventually begins a relationship with Sorenson, and Cat decides to enter the police academy.  Charley (now played by Sheila Kelley) becomes a foster parent to Jesse (Sean Nelson), the son of a woman at her free clinic who died. She also begins dating her colleague Dr. Wes Hayes (Michael Whaley), though he is initially resistant to an interracial relationship.  Reed (now played by Noelle Parker) returns to town after divorcing Kirby and losing custody of her daughter Halsey, and ends up running a high-priced call-girl ring.  Alex turns crucial evidence over to the police and Reed is sentenced to community service.  Teddy and Gabe decide to marry, but their wedding is interrupted when a heart donor is found for Big Al; Teddy and Gabe finally marry at the hospital just before Big Al is taken into surgery.  Charley decides to adopt Jesse, and plans to quickly marry Wes because two parents make a more appealing adoptive family; however, Charley eventually realizes Jesse should instead be adopted by the family that had already adopted his brother.  Charley and Wes marry anyway.  Alex's talk show is canceled again and she decides to take an extended trip to help flooding victims in Tennessee.  In the final episode, Georgie's college thesis about her sisters deeply angers Alex and Charley, though Teddy finds it amusing.  The sisters must put aside their differences when Beatrice has a major stroke. Shortly before Beatrice dies Frankie returns from Japan and clashes with Charley. Later, Frankie announces she wants to move back home to Winnetka.  Georgie sees John at Bea's memorial service and realizes she misses him; shortly afterward, she breaks up with Brian.  The sisters scatter their mother's ashes on the rosebushes she named after them.  Teddy announces she is pregnant with a daughter, who she plans to name Beatrice Rose.  Georgie and John discuss reconciling and share an embrace.  Finally, Alex assumes the role of family matriarch.

Characters

Main
Alexandra "Alex" Reed Halsey Barker (Swoosie Kurtz): Eldest sister Alex was wealthy and somewhat superficial, but remained protective and close to her sisters. Her first marriage to wealthy, cross-dressing plastic surgeon Wade Halsey (David Dukes) ended following his infidelity.  Alex's experience with breast cancer eventually led to a career as a talk show host, where she met and married "Big Al" Barker (Robert Klein), an outlandish but likeable home appliance retailer who sponsored her talk show as "The Prince of Pricetown".  She often clashed with her rebellious daughter Reed (Ashley Judd).  Alex is the only character to appear in every episode of the series.
Theodora "Teddy" Reed Margolis Falconer Sorenson (Sela Ward): Free-spirited second sister Teddy was a recovering alcoholic who had been living in California prior to the beginning of the series.  Upon her return to Winnetka, Teddy reacted poorly when she learned her ex-husband Mitch (Ed Marinaro) was in a relationship with her sister Frankie, and openly pursued Mitch even though he and Frankie were engaged.  In the aftermath of her behavior at Frankie and Mitch's wedding, Teddy seemed ashamed of herself, and in the next season of the show, she stopped drinking and stopped pursuing Mitch.  Teddy had been an artist as a teenager and during the series launched a career as a fashion designer, which led to a relationship with British millionaire Simon Bolt (Mark Frankel) who purchased and eventually sold her fashion company (then named "Theodora Reed"; Teddy then opened a new fashion company under the name "Teddy Reed," only to be ousted by her shareholders in season six and reopen yet again under the name T.R.). Teddy and Mitch had a teenage daughter, Cat (Heather McAdam).  When Cat was raped at college, Teddy met James Falconer (George Clooney), the detective who investigated the rape; he was killed shortly after their marriage.  In the final season, Teddy married neurosurgeon Dr. Gabriel Sorenson (Stephen Collins) and became pregnant with a daughter.
Georgiana "Georgie" Reed Whitsig (Patricia Kalember): The third and most level-headed and responsible sister, Georgie was a stay-at-home mom and off-and-on real estate agent. She was the most trusted confidant of her sisters. On the surface, she had an ideal domestic life with a loving if eccentric husband John (Garrett M. Brown) and two sons, Trevor (Ryan Francis) and Evan (Dustin Berkovitz).  After Evan successfully battled leukemia, Georgie decided to repay the blessing by acting as surrogate mother for her sister Frankie's child Thomas George.  Georgie experienced a major crisis when her son Trevor rebelled; he was eventually sent away to a school for troubled teens.  Georgie felt she was a failure as a parent and considered suicide, but abandoned the idea after realizing how deeply the rest of her family would feel such a loss.  Trevor eventually returned to his family, genuinely remorseful for all the harm he had done and eventually decides to enroll in the military. In the next season, Georgie sought professional help, only to fall under the spell of a corrupt therapist (played by Kalember's real-life husband, Daniel Gerroll). He manipulated Georgie into an affair, which eventually resulted in her divorce from John.  During the last season Georgie attended graduate school in psychology, where she met Brian, a younger man who she dated through the season.  In the series finale, it was implied that Georgie and John might reconcile.
Francesca "Frankie" Reed Margolis (Julianne Phillips) (seasons 1–5, special guest star in season 6): Youngest sister Frankie was a workaholic businesswoman.  She married her sister Teddy's ex-husband Mitch, and after discovering she suffered from infertility, asked her sister Georgie to act as a surrogate mother for her child Thomas George. She was also very devoted to her career, which put a strain on her relationship with Mitch and eventually resulted in their divorce. Following their divorce, Frankie quit her executive job and became the owner of the Sweet Sixteen, the sisters' favorite local diner.  In the fifth season, Phillips left the show and the Frankie character moved to Japan for work, although she did return for the two-hour series finale.
Dr. Charlotte "Charley" Bennett Hayes (Jo Anderson: recurring, seasons 4–5; Sheila Kelley: main, season 6): During the fourth season, the sisters discovered a fifth sister, the love child of an affair their father had had with another woman.  This fifth sister, Charley Bennett, was played initially by Jo Anderson on a recurring basis and then by Sheila Kelley, who received starring status in the final season. Charley was integrated into the story lines as Frankie was phased out, as Julianne Phillips had decided to leave the show.  Charley had spent her childhood in foster homes and was initially somewhat cold towards her newfound sisters, but eventually came to accept them into her life.  Charley was a doctor who worked in a free health care clinic with her colleague and eventual husband Dr. Wes Hayes.  During the final season, Charley took in an orphaned teenager named Jesse and intended to adopt him, but ultimately did not complete the adoption because she realized Jesse should go with his brother who had been adopted by another family.
Beatrice Reed Ventner (Elizabeth Hoffman): Beatrice, the sisters' mother and the family matriarch, was a recovering alcoholic who at the start of the series had been recently widowed.  Her husband's long-term affair with his nurse had caused her to seek solace in alcohol; she regretted that Teddy had apparently inherited her alcoholism.  In the third season she married retired local judge Truman Ventner, who later suffered from Alzheimer's. Beatrice died in the series finale.

Supporting
John Whitsig (Garrett M. Brown: seasons 1–5, special guest star in season 6): Georgie's husband John was the most prominently featured of all the sisters' husbands.  At the beginning of the series John had been laid off and spent much of his time at home in his bathrobe singing old vocal standards.  He recorded an album, "The Sound of Whitsig," but when his son Evan was diagnosed with leukemia, John returned to work as an accountant.  Brown received starring status for the first five seasons.  During season 5, Georgie and John separated in the wake of her affair with Dr. Caspian, and he did not return as a regular for the final season, though while offscreen John wrote a hit song, "Thank You, Babe, For Leavin' Me," which caused Georgie much consternation. John did return in the series finale, and it appeared that he and Georgie might reconcile.
Mitch Margolis (Ed Marinaro: seasons 1–4): Mitch was Teddy's high school sweetheart and first husband.  Together they had a daughter, Cat, but eventually Teddy and Mitch divorced. Later he started seeing her younger sister Frankie, which caused tension between the sisters. Mitch and Frankie eventually married and had a son, though they too ultimately divorced. Marinaro received starring status for the first four seasons, but did not make any appearances in seasons 5 and 6, though his character was mentioned on several occasions.
Catherine "Cat" Margolis (Heather McAdam: recurring, seasons 1–5; main, season 6): The daughter of Teddy and Mitch, Cat was the most prominently featured of all the sisters' children, appearing frequently throughout all the seasons. Cat was featured in a controversial storyline where she was raped. Eventually, as a result of this experience, she decided to become a cop. While training, she met her partner Billy, who she eventually fell in love with. During the final season McAdam received starring status, something none of the other children of the sisters had during the show's run.

Recurring
Dr. Wade Halsey (David Dukes: seasons 1–3): Dr. Wade Halsey was Alex's first husband and the father of their daughter Reed.  Wade was a successful plastic surgeon who resented that Alex needed everything in her life to be perfect, including him.  During the first season, Alex suspected Wade was cheating on her when she discovered lingerie receipts and hotel room charges on their credit card, but when she confronted him, she discovered he was actually a crossdresser.  In the second season it was revealed that Wade actually had been cheating on Alex with a former patient, and they divorced.  Wade decided he wanted Alex back and they reconciled toward the end of the second season, but during the third season when Alex expected him to propose remarriage, Wade announced he was marrying a different woman.  Wade's character did not appear after the third season.
Reed Halsey Philby (Kathy Wagner: season 1; Ashley Judd: seasons 2–4; Noelle Parker: season 6): Alex and Wade's daughter Reed appeared on and off throughout the show's run and was played by three different actresses. Kathy Wagner originated the role of Reed in season one; Ashley Judd took over the role in fall 1991, playing Reed in seasons 2–4. Judd left the show in 1994 to focus on her film career after winning critical acclaim for the film Ruby in Paradise. Reed was absent for season 5, and the character returned in season 6, portrayed by Noelle Parker.  Reed rebelled against her parents by dropping out of school, and later eloped with aspiring filmmaker Kirby Philby (Paul Rudd).  They had a daughter, Halsey, at the end of season 4.  By the final season Reed had divorced Kirby, lost custody of her daughter, and moved back to Winnetka where she eventually came to run a high-priced call girl ring.  After being arrested and sentenced to community service, Reed finally seemed to abandon her rebellious ways.
Truman Ventner (Philip Sterling: seasons 1–5): Beatrice's second husband Truman was a judge, and an acquaintance of Beatrice's because her first husband occasionally testified in medical trials.  They became reacquainted when Beatrice was arrested for driving under the influence and Truman was assigned to her case.  Beatrice and Truman eloped in the third-season premiere.  Truman was later diagnosed with Alzheimer's disease; once the disease had progressed, he asked Alex to assist him in taking his own life.
Victor Runkel (David Gianopoulos: season 2): Victor was Alex's plumber who she dated after divorcing her husband.  Victor was actually an heir of the wealthy van Runkel family, but had grown up an orphan and decided to make his own way in life by becoming a plumber.  His access to family money, however, allowed him to pay off Alex's mortgage without her knowledge, though Alex was eventually able to discover he was her benefactor.  Victor left Winnetka to live in France to tend to his ailing uncle and take over managing the family fortune.
Kirby Philby (Paul Rudd: seasons 3–4, 6): Alex's daughter Reed eloped with Kirby, an aspiring filmmaker, and together they had a daughter, Halsey. Kirby eventually realized he could not support his family as a filmmaker and decided to settle down in Bemidji, Minnesota and manage a video store.  Reed could not accept this change in their circumstances and divorced Kirby; he received full custody of their daughter.  Reed initially told Alex that Kirby had left her and kidnapped their daughter, but Alex tracked him down and learned the truth.
Simon Bolt (Mark Frankel: seasons 3–4): Simon was a wealthy British investor who transformed Teddy's fashion design business from a small home operation to a large design company.  Simon and Teddy dated during the third season, but broke up when he sold her company to a Texan investor without consulting Teddy.  Later, Simon returned, claiming to have seen the error of his ways, and proposed to Teddy; she accepted, only to turn him down shortly thereafter when he again made plans for their married life without consulting her.  During the fourth season, Simon faked his own death in a sailing accident; he had actually embezzled a sizable amount of money from a European company, which he claimed was necessary to protect the workers' pensions.  He turned up on Teddy's doorstep, only to find her with Falconer; Falconer in turn discovered Simon was a wanted man and notified Scotland Yard.  However, instead of handing him over to Scotland Yard, Falconer ultimately let Simon escape.
Detective James Falconer (George Clooney: seasons 4–5): Detective Falconer met Teddy when he investigated the rape of her daughter Cat.  They began dating after running into each other at an AA meeting, thus discovering they were both recovering alcoholics.  Falconer had been married before, but his marriage ended after his six-year-old son accidentally killed himself using Falconer's service revolver; Falconer could not forgive himself for his son's death.  Teddy and Falconer married, and shortly afterward he was killed by a car bomb set by a criminal he was planning to testify against in court.
Norma Lear (Nora Dunn: seasons 4–6): Former Saturday Night Live cast member Nora Dunn portrayed Alex's TV producer Norma Lear (a clear play on the name of famous real-life TV producer Norman Lear). She and Alex initially did not get along, but eventually became great friends.  Norma was a lesbian (though her partner Chris never appeared onscreen), and in season five Alex's husband Big Al donated sperm to her so that she and her partner could have a baby.
Alvin "Big Al" Barker Barkowitz (Robert Klein: seasons 4–6): Big Al was the owner of Pricetown, a home goods and appliance store that sponsored Alex's talk show. Alex disliked him at first, as did much of her family, but eventually she fell in love with him and he became her second husband.  Big Al served time in prison for tax evasion, which he blamed on his accountant; he was released from prison early for saving the governor's wife from drowning in the prison pool.  He subsequently ran for mayor of Winnetka and won.  In the sixth season Big Al decided to embrace his Jewish heritage and reverted to his family surname, Barkowitz.
Dr. Wes Hayes (Michael Whaley: seasons 5–6): Wes served as director of the free health clinic where he and Charley both worked.  He and Charley were attracted to each other, but Wes was uncomfortable having a relationship with a white woman.  He eventually began a relationship with Charley after she convinced him to turn down an offer to open another free clinic in Detroit.  At the end of season six, he and Charley married.
Dr. Gabriel Sorenson (Stephen Collins: season 6): Dr. Sorenson was Teddy's neurosurgeon, then love interest and eventual husband during the show's final season.  He had been married three times before marrying Teddy and had a daughter, Melissa, who was attending medical school in Boston.  Sorenson was a brilliant doctor and received a presidential nomination for health czar, but turned down the appointment after government officials asked Teddy to stay away from Washington due to her checkered past.
Brian Kohler-Voss (Joe Flanigan: season 6): Georgie's much-younger lover was a graduate student she met after returning to school following her divorce from John. Brian was the son of a famous psychologist who was following in his father's footsteps.  Georgie eventually broke it off with Brian when she realized she missed John.
Billy Griffin (Eric Close: season 6): Billy was Cat's police partner and eventual love interest.  He had a difficult relationship with his father, an ex-con who claimed to have mended his ways but ultimately stole money from Bea.

Notable guest stars
Many well-known TV stars guest starred on the show, including Gregory Harrison (5 episodes), Charlotte Rae (3 episodes), and William Katt (2 episodes). Diane Ladd and Joyce Van Patten both guest starred as Belle, Charley's mom. Real-life sisters Audrey Meadows and Jayne Meadows played sisters on the show. Other guest stars included Darren McGavin, Denise Crosby, Ilene Graff, Christina Pickles, Dorothy Lyman, Gloria Henry, Carrie Snodgress, Deborah Harmon, and Elayne Boosler.

Patricia Kalember's real-life husband Daniel Gerroll guest starred as her predatory therapist for 11 episodes in season 5. Also Naomi Judd guest starred in the episode that marked her real-life daughter Ashley's final appearance as Reed.

Episodes

Season 1 (1991)

Season 2 (1991–92)

Season 3 (1992–93)

Season 4 (1993–94)

Season 5 (1994–95)

Season 6 (1995–96)

Home media
On June 2, 2015, it was announced that Shout! Factory (under WB license) had acquired the rights to the series in Region 1; they have subsequently released all six seasons on DVD.

Reception

Ratings

Accolades
The series received eight Emmy Award nominations over the course of its run, winning once in 1994 for Sela Ward as Outstanding Lead Actress in a Drama Series. Swoosie Kurtz was also nominated twice in the Outstanding Lead Actress in a Drama Series category in 1993 and 1994.

References
Notes

External links
 

American television soap operas
American primetime television soap operas
NBC original programming
1990s American drama television series
Television series by Warner Bros. Television Studios
1991 American television series debuts
1996 American television series endings
Television shows set in Illinois
English-language television shows
Television series about sisters
Television series by Lorimar Television
Primetime Emmy Award-winning television series
Television series about siblings